Roel Velasco (born June 26, 1969 in Bago, Negros Occidental) is a retired boxer from the Philippines. He competed in the light flyweight (– 48 kg) division during the late 1980s, early 1990s.

He represented his native country of the Philippines at the 1992 Summer Olympics in Barcelona, Spain, where he won the bronze medal. In the semi-finals he was stopped by Cuba's eventual winner Rogelio Marcelo. He is the elder brother of Mansueto Velasco, who won the silver medal at the 1996 Summer Olympics in the same weight division. Roel won the silver medal at the 1997 World Amateur Boxing Championships.

Roel Velasco is the only Filipino to win a medal in the Goodwill Games by snatching the bronze in the light-flyweight division in boxing in the 1998 New York edition. 1997 was a banner year for Velasco as he added the gold medals in the 1st Muhamad Ali Invitational Boxing Championships in Kentucky, the Italian Boxing Championships and the Roberto Balado Cup in Cuba to his World Championship hardware.

Velasco is currently serving with the Philippine Navy with the rank of Petty Officer First Class (P01) while doing double duty as a coach with the Philippine Boxing Team.

As a trainer, Roel is known for his way of selecting his pupils. As he welcomes anyone who wants to learn from him. He is also known to have an interest in training inexperienced or slow learners stating that:

"Kahit na anong hina ng isang boxer basta masipag sa training, siya ay gagaling na pwede pang higitan ang isang boxer na may talento."
("Even if a boxer is slow learner, he/she can grow into a strong fighter as long as he/she is dedicated to his/her training and can even surpass the strength of a talented boxer.")

Retirement
Roel retired from boxing around 2001 and he's now currently a boxing trainer to younger boxers who want become the next boxing champion.

Olympic results 
Defeated James Wanene (Kenya) 16–1
Defeated Rajendra Prasad (India) 15–6
Defeated Rowan Williams (Great Britain) 7–6
Lost to Rogelio Marcelo (Cuba) RSC 1 (1:36)

References
 databaseOlympics.com
 Profile

1972 births
Living people
Olympic boxers of the Philippines
Boxers at the 1992 Summer Olympics
Olympic bronze medalists for the Philippines
Boxers from Negros Occidental
Olympic medalists in boxing
Medalists at the 1992 Summer Olympics
Boxers at the 1998 Asian Games
Filipino male boxers
AIBA World Boxing Championships medalists
Asian Games competitors for the Philippines
Goodwill Games medalists in boxing
Light-flyweight boxers
Competitors at the 1998 Goodwill Games
Philippine Sports Hall of Fame inductees